Acanthoplacatus is a genus of monogeneans in the family Gyrodactylidae.

Species
Acanthoplacatus adlardi Ernst, Jones & Whittington, 2001
Acanthoplacatus amplihamus Ernst, Jones & Whittington, 2001
Acanthoplacatus brauni Ernst, Jones & Whittington, 2001
Acanthoplacatus parvihamus Ernst, Jones & Whittington, 2001
Acanthoplacatus puelli Ernst, Jones & Whittington, 2001
Acanthoplacatus shieldsi Ernst, Jones & Whittington, 2001
Acanthoplacatus sigani Ernst, Jones & Whittington, 2001

References

Gyrodactylidae
Monogenea genera